The Minister of War of the Netherlands, was the minister responsible for the Ministry of War and the Royal Netherlands Army. The position was abolished with the creation of the position for Minister of Defence.

The first Minister of War was Charles Nepveu, while the last one was Alexander Fiévez, a member of the Catholic People's Party.

List of officeholders

See also
 List of Ministers of Defence of the Netherlands
 Minister of the Navy

References

Military of the Netherlands
War